107th meridian may refer to:

107th meridian east, a line of longitude east of the Greenwich Meridian
107th meridian west, a line of longitude west of the Greenwich Meridian